Joquicingo is a municipality in Mexico State in Mexico. The municipal seat is the town of Joquicingo de León Guzmán.  The municipality covers an area of  49.2 km².

As of 2005, the municipality had a total population of 11,042.

In 2021, Joquicingo was the location of the deadly bus crash.

References

Municipalities of the State of Mexico
Populated places in the State of Mexico